André Decours (15 November 1902 – 20 June 1972) was a French rower. He competed in the men's coxed four event at the 1928 Summer Olympics.

References

External links
 

1902 births
1972 deaths
French male rowers
Olympic rowers of France
Rowers at the 1928 Summer Olympics
Place of birth missing